Joseph Kotys (October 31, 1925 – August 21, 2012) was an American artistic gymnast. He won a team gold medal and three individual medals at the 1955 Pan American Games. At the 1948 Summer Olympics, he placed seventh with the team and had his best individual result of 23rd place on pommel horse.

Kotys fought in World War II as a gunner on a Boeing B-17 Flying Fortress and completed 22 missions. He also competed as a diver and won the Ohio Conference three times. As a gymnast he won the NCAA titles all-around in 1949–50, on parallel bars in 1949–50, on the horizontal bar in 1950, and on the pommel horse in 1951. He also won three AAU titles, in the vault in 1948 and on parallel bars in 1948 and 1951. While competing on rings at the 1956 U.S. Olympic Trials he crashed to the floor due to a failed support mount. He retired soon after that to become a gymnastics coach in Ohio. In 1978 he was inducted into the U.S. Gymnastics Hall of Fame.
He was the gymnastics coach at Cuyahoga Falls, Ohio in the early 1960’s.

References

1925 births
2012 deaths
Gymnasts at the 1948 Summer Olympics
Olympic gymnasts of the United States
American male artistic gymnasts
Pan American Games medalists in gymnastics
Pan American Games gold medalists for the United States
Pan American Games silver medalists for the United States
Pan American Games bronze medalists for the United States
Gymnasts at the 1955 Pan American Games
Medalists at the 1955 Pan American Games